is a passenger railway station in located in the city of Kadoma, Osaka Prefecture, Japan, operated by the private railway company Keihan Electric Railway and the third sector Osaka Monorail.

Lines
Kadoma-shi Station is served by the  Keihan Main Line, and is located 10.1 km from the starting point of the line at Yodoyabashi Station. It is also served by the Osaka Monorail Main Line and is 21.2 kilometers from Osaka Airport Station.

Station layout
The Keihan station has two ground-level opposed side side platforms, with an elevated station building.The Osaka Monorail station is located in the south of the Keihan Main Line and has an island platform serving two elevated tracks.

Platforms

Adjacent stations

History
It was renamed to its present name on March 23, 1975. The Osaka Monorail began operations on August 22, 1997.

Passenger statistics
In fiscal 2019, the Keihan station was used by an average of 30,439 passengers daily and the Osaka Monorail portion was used by 23,027 passengers daily

Surrounding area
Kadoma City Hall
Kadoma Fire Station
Kadoma City Library
Kadoma Ginza Shopping Street (Shotengai)
Sumitomo-dori Shopping Street (Shotengai)
Izumiya
Panasonic Corporation branch office

Bus stop
Keihan Bus Co., Ltd.
Route 3 for  via Shikenjo-mae (only 1 service every day except Saturdays, Sundays and holidays)

See also
List of railway stations in Japan

References

External links

Keihan Official home page 
Osaka Monorail Official home page 

Railway stations in Japan opened in 1971
Railway stations in Japan opened in 1997
Railway stations in Osaka Prefecture
Kadoma, Osaka